Sveltella philippii is a species of sea snail, a marine gastropod mollusk in the family Cancellariidae, the nutmeg snails.

This is a replacement name for Cancellaria parva Philippi, 1860, non Lea, 1833

Description

Distribution

References

 Hemmen J. (2007) Recent Cancellariidae. Annotated and illustrated catalogue of Recent Cancellariidae. Privately published, Wiesbaden. 428 pp. [With amendments and corrections taken from Petit R.E. (2012) A critique of, and errata for, Recent Cancellariidae by Jens Hemmen, 2007. Conchologia Ingrata 9: 1–8

External links

Cancellariidae
Gastropods described in 1899